The Governor of the Central Bank of Kenya is the chief executive officer and a member of the board of directors of the Central Bank of Kenya. The current governor is Patrick Ngugi Njoroge, who was nominated by Uhuru Kenyatta, the president of Kenya, on 2 June 2015. After vetting by the parliamentary committee on Finance, Trade and Planning on 17 June 2015, he was approved by the parliament of Kenya on 18 June 2015.

Governors of the Central Bank of Kenya
The following individuals have served as governor since the institution was founded in 1966.

References